The Hooley Dooleys were an Australian children's music and performance act which began in 1996. Their material was aimed at children between the ages of two and seven. They originally appeared on the Australian Broadcasting Corporation (ABC), but then appeared on commercial television and as a live touring act. Early members of the group were David Butts, Antoine Demarest and Bruce Thorburn; director and producer was Jacqueline Cairns; and the early childhood advisor was Angela McLean. 

By 1998, the group was directed and produced by Jane Davidson. In November that year David Brearly of The Australian reported that there were hostilities between management and the entertainers regarding marketing and conflict of interests.

At the ARIA Music Awards of 1999 their fourth studio album, Pop!, won the Best Children's Album trophy. The group was nominated in the same category in seven other years. 

By 2000, their producer and director was Colin Bromley, and, by 2004, Thorburn had left the group with Butts and Demarest set to continue. In June 2006, they ended their association with the ABC, and entered into a new distribution deal with Warner Bros.

For their 2006 material, additional voices were provided by Kirsten Butts – wife of David Butts – and Mal Heap; they were produced by Jill Coleburn, and directed by Missy Stephens-Gaha. In February 2007 The Australians Michael Bodey and Jim Gaines described how The Hooley Dooleys had "broken free in contentious circumstances", the group had been restricted at the ABC to "merely bit players below the [network's] premier suite of money-spinners, The Wiggles, Bananas in Pyjamas and Play School". The group planned to enhance their associated characters: Tickle the Doodat, to promote tolerance; Russell the Muscley Kangaroo, (health and fitness); Penelope Perfect (creativity); and Captain Catastrophe (safety). 

By 2008, Butts was the only original member of the group which consisted of seven performers. New characters were Lou Lou, Katie, Adam and Ginner, which joined Tickle, Russell and Captain. The ensemble toured rural New South Wales in July 2009, however The Hooley Dooleys disbanded later that year.

Cast

Original members
 David Butts, (b. 6 August 1961) Blue – saxophone, keyboards, guitar, vocals, songwriter, producer (1996-2009)
 As of 6 August 2008, Butts' 47th birthday, was married to his wife, Kirsten and the couple had four children. Butts also had a daughter from a previous relationship. He had studied at Sydney Conservatorium of Music and then worked as a music teacher before forming The Hooley Dooleys in 1996.
 Antoine Demarest, (b. 8 November 1972) Red – trombone, keyboards, guitar, vocals, songwriter, producer (1996-2006)
 As of April 2003, Demarest, aged 30, and his wife, Jane, had a daughter named Tara.
 Since having been in the Hooley Dooleys, Demarest had been actively continuing a music career including later forming a new group with Bruce Thorburn called Loop De Loop and even releasing his own album in 2013 called Ant-1
 Bruce Thorburn, (b. 10 February 1960) Yellow – violin, keyboards, guitar, vocals, songwriter, producer (1996-2003)
 As of April 2003, Thorburn, aged 43, and his wife, Mandy, had three children - twin daughters Ella and Ruby and son Oscar.
 Since having left the Hooley Dooleys, Thorburn would later reunite with Demarest in forming a new comedy group called Loop De Loop.

Other characters
 Russell the Muscley Kangaroo – (1996-2009)
 Tickle the Doodat – (1997-2009)
 Chalk and Cheese the Cockatoos – (2002)
 Poss the Possum – (2002-2005)
 Captain Catastrophe – (2004-2009)
 Penelope Perfect – (2004-2006)
 Lou Lou – (2007-2008)
 Katie – (2007-2008)
 Adam – (2007-2008)
 Ginner – (2007-2008)

Awards

ARIA Music Awards

APRA Music Awards

Albums
 The Hooley Dooleys (1996)
 Splash (1997)
 Ready, Set... Go! (1998)
 Pop! (1999)
 Keep on Dancing (2000)
 Roll Up! Roll Up! (2001)
 Oopsadazee (2002)
 Wonderful (2003)
 Super Dooper (2004)
 Smile (2005)

Videography
 The Hooley Dooleys (1997)
 Ready, Set... Go (1998)
 Pop! (1999)
 Keep on Dancing (2000)
 Roll Up! Roll Up! (2001)
 The Hooley Dooleys to the Rescue (2002)
 Oopsadazee (2002)
 Wonderful (2003)
 2 in 1 Pack: The Hooley Dooleys & Ready, Set... Go  (2003)
 All Together Now (2004)
 Super Dooper (2004)
 At the Farm (2005)
 2 in 1 Pack: Roll Up! Roll Up! & Pop  (2005)
 2 in 1 Pack: Oopsadazee & Keep On Dancing  (2006)
 How 2 Exercise (2006)
 How 2 Go to School (2006)
 How 2 Give at Christmas (2006)

References

1996 Australian television series debuts
2006 Australian television series endings
Australian children's musical groups
Australian children's television series
Australian musical trios
Australian preschool education television series
Australian television shows featuring puppetry
English-language television shows
ARIA Award winners
Australian Broadcasting Corporation original programming
New South Wales musical groups
Musical groups established in 1996
Musical groups disestablished in 2009